The Agno River, or Pangasinan River, is a river in the island of Luzon, in the Philippines.

The river originates in the Cordillera Mountains and empties into the South China Sea via Lingayen Gulf. Roughly two million people live in the Agno River Valley, and it comprises one of Philippines' larger population clusters.

The river is dammed by three hydroelectric power plants: the Ambuklao Dam in Bokod, the Binga Dam in Itogon, and the San Roque Dam in San Manuel.

Geography
It is the third largest river in Luzon (next to Cagayan River and Pampanga River) and the fifth largest river in the Philippines.

The Agno is the largest Philippine river in terms of water discharge, draining around 6.6 cubic kilometers of fresh water into Lingayen Gulf, or almost 70% of the total fresh water input into the gulf.

Of its total length, about  runs through mountainous terrain and canyons.

As the river descends following a southerly course, it exhibits a braided channel pattern. It then transforms into a southwest-directed meandering river as it crosses the Central Luzon Plain. From its confluence with the Tarlac River emanating from the south, the Agno River then veers northward while draining the eastern flanks of the Zambales Mountains.

The Agno's principal tributaries include the Pila, Camiling, Tarlac and Ambayoan Rivers. The main branch of the Agno River is Tarlac River which originates from Mount Pinatubo (elevation ) in Tarlac and joins the Agno River at Poponto Swamp near Bayambang.

After passing through mountains at an average elevation of some  ASL, the Agno River forms a vast alluvial fan and delta called the Pangasinan Plain, a historically vital economic hub on Luzon Island.

A number of faults of local and regional significance cut across the river. Joint systems are also found in the area. These faults and joints reduce the rock strength and rock coherence through which water could pass or slippage could occur.

The Philippine Fault System, including the Digdig Fault, which has been assessed as the causative fault of the July 16 1990 Luzon earthquake, and the San Manuel Fault, Bulangit Fault and the San Roque Fault are some of the major fault lines crossing the river.

The river's headwaters and upstream basin in the Cordillera Central range are designated conservation areas that lie within the Mount Data National Park, the Upper Agno River Basin Resource Reserve and the Lower Agno Watershed Forest Reserve.

Flora and fauna
Spanish explorers who documented the catchment area of the river in the 16th century say the mouth of the Agno was an extensive marshland with rich alluvial soil. It was thickly covered with mangrove and nipa palm trees which served as habitat to many marshland wildlife species.

But the catchment area is now severely deforested. Primary forest has almost completely disappeared apart from a few areas above  ASL. The forests have been replaced by grassland and riceland.

Flooding
Since the Agno River basin is characterized by mountainous topography, the Ambuklao water reservoir was built to keep it from gushing down and causing devastating effects on the lower levels of the river, the flood runoff estimated annually at about 6,654 million cubic meters reaches the plain in several hours in the river mouth in about a day.

The Pangasinan Plain suffers from recurrent and destructive floods. The catastrophic floods of July–August 1972, May 1976, and September 2009 inundated the entire Pangasinan Plain, including the floodplains of the Tarlac River.

The PAGASA, the national weather bureau, has established a flood monitoring and warning center in Pangasinan.

People
The Agno traverses several towns in Benguet province where some 35,000 indigenous Ibaloi, Kankanaey and Kalanguya people live. The Ibaloi people of Benguet regard the river as sacred because it gives life.

Barangay Dalupirip, Itogon in Benguet province is held sacred by its people. Portions of the land serve as the burial grounds of their ancestors. The place holds great historical value and is considered one of the remaining seats of Ibaloi culture.

Archaeological sites were discovered at Sitio Camanggaan, Barangay San Roque in San Manuel, Pangasinan and in surrounding areas. Yields consisted of tradeware and earthenware shards and Palaeolithic and Neolithic stone tools.

Economic importance
Gold panning was common along the river, with gold found along the river from Kabayan, Benguet, to San Manuel, Pangasinan, and along its tributaries in Tublay, Benguet, and Bokod, Benguet.

The river has three hydroelectric plants: Binga Dam in Itogon, Benguet ( upstream); Ambuklao Dam in Bokod, Benguet ( upstream) and the San Roque Dam in San Manuel, Pangasinan. Binga has been operational since 1960 and Ambuklao since 1956.

There are several mining concessions in the upper reaches of the river.

The government has also established the Agno River irrigation system to provide irrigation water to some 60 to 100 square kilometers of ricelands in Pangasinan.

Crossings 
This is listed from mouth to source.

 Domalandan Bridge (Lingayen–Labrador Road, Lingayen)
 Bugallon Bridge (Bugallon)
 Bocboc Bridge (Gallego Street, Aguilar–San Carlos boundary)
 Mangatarem–Urbiztondo Road (Mangatarem, Pangasinan–Urbiztondo, Pangasinan boundary)
 President Carlos P. Romulo Bridge (Camiling–Malasiqui–Santa Barbara Rd, Bayambang–Camiling, Tarlac boundary)
 Calvo Bridge (Alcala–Bayambang Road, Bayambang–Bautista boundary)
 Teofilo Sison Bridge (Rosales–Villasis boundary)
 Tomana Underpass (Rosales–Villasis boundary)
 Narciso Ramos Bridge (Santa Maria–Binalonan Road, Asingan, Pangasinan)
 Ambuklao By-pass Bridge (Bokod)
 Liboong Hanging Bridge (Bokod)
 Bokod–Kabayan–Buguias–Abatan Road (Buguias, Benguet)

Cities and municipalities
The following list shows the cities and towns traversed by the Agno River, ordered upstream going downstream:

 Buguias, Benguet (location of Mount Data)
 Kabayan, Benguet
 Bokod, Benguet (drains into the Ambuklao Dam)
 Itogon, Benguet (drains into the Binga Dam)
 San Manuel, Pangasinan (drains into the San Roque Dam)
 San Nicolas, Pangasinan
 Santa Maria, Pangasinan
 Asingan, Pangasinan
 Villasis, Pangasinan
 Rosales, Pangasinan
 Santo Tomas, Pangasinan
 Alcala, Pangasinan
 Bayambang, Pangasinan
 Bautista, Pangasinan
 Camiling, Tarlac
 Urbiztondo, Pangasinan
 Mangatarem, Pangasinan
 San Carlos City, Pangasinan
 Aguilar, Pangasinan
 Bugallon, Pangasinan
 Lingayen, Pangasinan (location of river mouth)
 Labrador, Pangasinan

References

Further reading
 Siringan, Fernando P. and Mateo, Zenon Richard P. Sediment load partitioning of the Agno River and changes in the shoreline position, National Institute of Geological Sciences, University of the Philippines, Diliman, Quezon City
 Torres, Ronnie C.; Paladio, Ma. Lynn O.; Punongbayan, Raymundo S.; and Alonso, Rosalito A. Mapping of Areas Affected by Liquefaction during the July 16, 1990, Earthquake Philippine Institute of Volcanology and Seismology and University of the Philippines National Institute of Geological Sciences

External links

Philippine Atmospheric, Geophysical and Astronomical Services Administration
Institute of Philippine Culture's Case Study of San Roque Multipurpose Project
International Rivers

Rivers of the Philippines
Landforms of Benguet
Landforms of Pangasinan